United Commercial Bank PLC (UCB) is a private commercial bank in Bangladesh that is not a foreign bank (FCB) and is listed in Dhaka's stock exchange, as well as the Chittagong Stock Exchange. It was established in 1983, twelve years after independence.

History
The Bank was  incorporated on 26 June 1983. The government owns shares in the bank. The bank is listed in both Dhaka Stock exchange and Chittagong stock exchange. In 2016 foreign hackers used skimmers to steal personal data from the banks ATM and used that data to clone cards.

UCB Fintech Company Limited 
UCB has come up with their own MFS called উপায় (UCB Fintech Company Limited). With Upay, you can cash out and send money to other upay users as well. Upay is a digital financial service brand owned by UCB Fintech Company Limited, a United Commercial Bank affiliate. Upay began its journey in early 2021 after acquiring a license from Bangladesh Bank, delivering a wide range of mobile financial services to consumers from all walks of life. 

Upay has recently had successful acquisitions with companies like Grameenphone, Robi and Banglalink to ensure that their users will not need an active internet line to use the application. This makes it easier for users to use Upay, as now they will not have to buy additional mobile data to have access to their upay account unlike many of its competitors.

References

Banks established in 1983
Banks of Bangladesh
Banks of Bangladesh with Islamic banking services
Companies listed on the Dhaka Stock Exchange
Companies listed on the Chittagong Stock Exchange